Diiron silicide (Fe2Si) is an intermetallic compound, a silicide of iron. It occurs in  cosmic dust as the mineral hapkeite. It is a non-stoichiometric compound where the Fe:Si ratio depends on the sample preparation. A related compound Fe5Si3 occurs in nature as the mineral xifengite.

See also
Ferrosilicon

References

Iron compounds
Transition metal silicides